Caloptilia xanthopharella is a moth of the family Gracillariidae. It is known from Australia (Queensland and New South Wales), Fiji, the Solomon Islands and Vanuatu.

The larvae feed on Glochidion species, including Glochidion ferdinandi. They probably mine the leaves of their host plant.

References

xanthopharella
Moths of Oceania
Moths described in 1880